Yusuf Mainge (born 26 December 1999) is a Kenyan footballer who plays as a defender for Gor Mahia.

Club career

FK Pohronie
Prior to his league debut, Mainge appeared in a Slovnaft Cup fixture against 5th league side ŠK Selce. He came on as a second half replacement for Michal Klec during the 9:0 victory.

Mainge made his professional Fortuna Liga debut for Pohronie against Žilina on 21 September 2019. Žilina were leading the league table, at that point. Mainge was booked with a yellow card in the first half and had played for 80 minutes before being replaced by András Mészáros, in an effort to score an equalising goal. After goals against by Filip Kaša and Slovak international Róbert Boženík, Pohronie lost the game 1:2. He was also featured in the following league games against Senica and Zemplín Michalovce and a Cup fixture against Rakytovce.

Mainge made no appearances in the spring and did not return to the squad following the league disruption caused by the COVID-19 pandemic. He also cited personal reasons as for his decision to return to native Kenya. Nonetheless, Mainge stated thankfulness and wished the Žiar nad Hronom-based club the best of luck.

International career
Mainge played in four 2019 Cup of Nations qualifiers against Mauritius U23 and Sudan U23.
 He was also the captain of the U23 side.

In October 2019, Mainge made his debut for Kenya during a friendly match against Mozambique. The match concluded in a 0:1 defeat.

Personal life
Per his social media communication, Mainge adheres to Islam.

References

External links
 FK Pohronie profile 
 
 

1999 births
Living people
Kenyan footballers
Kenyan expatriate footballers
Kenya international footballers
Association football midfielders
A.F.C. Leopards players
FK Pohronie players
Gor Mahia F.C. players
Kenyan Premier League players
Slovak Super Liga players
Expatriate footballers in Slovakia
Kenyan expatriate sportspeople in Slovakia